Benjamin May-Lewis House is a historic home located near Farmville, Pitt County, North Carolina.  It was built in the 1830s, as a two-story, three bay, single pile, Federal style frame dwelling with a rear shed wing.  It was remodeled in the 1850s with Greek Revival style design elements.  Also on the property are the contributing smokehouse and other farm related outbuildings.

It was added to the National Register of Historic Places in 1985.

References

Houses on the National Register of Historic Places in North Carolina
Federal architecture in North Carolina
Greek Revival houses in North Carolina
Houses in Pitt County, North Carolina
National Register of Historic Places in Pitt County, North Carolina
1830s establishments in North Carolina